These are things named after Siméon Denis Poisson (1781 – 1840), a French mathematician.

Physics
 Poisson’s Equations (thermodynamics)
 Poisson’s Equation (rotational motion)
Schrödinger–Poisson equation
Vlasov–Poisson equation

Hamiltonian mechanics
Poisson bracket

Electrostatics
Poisson equation
Euler–Poisson–Darboux equation
Poisson–Boltzmann equation
Screened Poisson equation

Optics
Poisson's spot

Elasticity
Poisson's ratio

Mathematics
Dirichlet–Poisson problem
Poisson algebra
Poisson superalgebra
Poisson boundary
Poisson bracket, see Hamiltonian mechanics header
Poisson games
Poisson manifold
Poisson ring
Poisson supermanifold
Poisson–Charlier polynomials
Poisson-Hopf algebra
Poisson–Mellin–Newton cycle
Poisson–Lie group

Probability theory
Boolean-Poisson model
Poisson bootstrap
Poisson distribution
Compound Poisson distribution
Conditional Poisson distribution
Conway–Maxwell–Poisson distribution
Displaced Poisson distribution
Geometric Poisson distribution
Poisson binomial distribution
Poisson clumping
Super-Poissonian distribution
Poisson process
Compound Poisson process
Mixed Poisson process
Poisson sampling
Poisson scatter theorem
Poisson random measure
Poisson-type random measure
Poisson regression
Fixed-effect Poisson model
Poisson limit theorem
Poisson zeros

Mathematical analysis
Poisson's (differential) equation, Poisson (differential) equation; see Electrostatics header
Poisson solver, numerical software designed to solve Poisson's differential equation
Poisson differential operator
 Dirichlet–Poisson problem  
Discrete Poisson equation
Poisson kernel
Poisson integral formula
Poisson–Jensen formula

Fourier analysis
Poisson summation formula (Poisson resummation)

Wavelet theory
Poisson wavelet

Computer science
Poisson disk
Poisson image editing

Other
Advanced Poisson-Boltzmann Solver
Poisson (crater) on the Moon
Collège Denis Poisson in Pithiviers

References

Poisson